The 1999 Washington summit was the 16th NATO (North Atlantic Treaty Organization) summit, a three-day meeting held in Washington, D.C. on April 23–25, 1999.

Held at the height of the NATO bombing of Yugoslavia, the summit commemorated the 50th anniversary of NATO and reiterated the "determination to put an end to the repressive actions" by Serbian President Milošević against the local ethnic Albanian population in Kosovo. It was also the first summit in which three new NATO members (the Czech Republic, Hungary, and Poland) participated. 

The Membership Action Plan (MAP), an important part of NATO's Open Door Policy, was adopted, and a revised version of the Strategic Concept was made public. The European Security and Defence Identity within NATO was also enhanced; the Defence Capabilities Initiative and the Weapons of Mass Destruction Initiative were launched. The Partnership for Peace, the Euro-Atlantic Partnership Council, and the Mediterranean Dialogue were strengthened.

References

External link 
 Washington Summit

1999 Washington summit
1999 in politics
1999 in the United States
Summit of 1999
Diplomatic conferences in the United States
20th-century diplomatic conferences
1999 in international relations
1999 conferences
United States and NATO
April 1999 events in the United States